Halabi is an Arabic or Jewish locational surname, or nisba, denoting origin from Aleppo  (Halab), Syria, or those who traded with Aleppo residents. Variants of the name include Halaby, Haleb, Halep, and Halepovich. People with the surname include:

Amir Halaby (born 1986), Israeli football player
Ibrāhīm al-Ḥalabī (died 1549), Ottoman Ḥanafī legist
Lisa Halaby (born 1951), Queen Noor of Jordan
Majdi Halabi (1985–2005), Israeli soldier 
Muhammad Ali al-Halabi (born 1937), Syrian politician and Prime Minister
Najeeb Halaby (1915–2003), Lebanese-American businessman
Rola El-Halabi (born 1985), Lebanese-German boxer
Salah Halabi, Egyptian army officer
Samia Halaby (born 1936), Palestinian artist 
Simon Halabi (born 1950), Syrian businessman
Suleiman al-Halabi (1777–1800), Syrian assassin
Susan Halabi, Lebanese-American biostatistician
Usama Halabi (born 1959), Palestinian lawyer
Yasser El Halaby (born 1984), Egyptian squash player

See also
Alabi

References

Arabic-language surnames
Nisbas